Juma River may refer to:

 Juma River (Brazil), a river in the Amazonas state of Brazil
 Juma River (China), a river in northern China

See also 
 Juma (disambiguation)